Oilers Entertainment Group (OEG) is a company based out of Edmonton, Alberta, that operates Katz Group of Companies' sports and entertainment offerings. The flagship property and namesake is the Edmonton Oilers of the National Hockey League. OEG  also operates Rogers Place, the new home of the Oilers in downtown Edmonton. OEG is owned by Daryl Katz.

History
When Daryl Katz bought the Oilers in 2008 from Edmonton Investors Group, he created Rexall Sports Corporation as an umbrella for Katz Group's sports and entertainment interests.

The company was reorganized as Oilers Entertainment Group in 2014, with former Hockey Canada president Bob Nicholson as vice chairman.  In 2015, he became chief executive officer and operating head of Katz' entertainment interests, including the Oilers.

On April 24, 2015 OEG announced the appointment of Peter Chiarelli as President of Hockey Operations and General Manager of the Oilers.

Operations
Originally beginning with just the Oilers, OEG has grown to include a significant portfolio of sports and entertainment offerings. OEG now owns and operates the Edmonton Oil Kings of the Western Hockey League and the Bakersfield Condors of the American Hockey League. From January 2014 to September 2016, OEG owned the Bakersfield Condors/Norfolk Admirals franchise in the ECHL. OEG also owns Aquila Productions, which produces film & television, live events and broadcasts, and corporate and branded messaging services.

In April 2015, Katz announced a partnership with film producer Joel Silver to create Silver Pictures Entertainment – a new company that will develop, produce and provide or arrange financing for feature films, television and digital projects.  Katz’ interests in the company fall under the OEG umbrella.

OEG also operates Rogers Place, a multi-use indoor arena that is home to the Edmonton Oilers and the Edmonton Oil Kings. In addition to sporting events, the arena plays host to concerts and other events in the Ice District, a mixed-use sports and entertainment development, featuring a winter garden - a key part of the architectural design used as a large multi-use indoor public space - and an adjoining community rink which is open to the public.

In 2022, OEG acquired the Tokyo Smoke brand and 23 retail cannabis stores from Canopy Growth.

See also
Daryl Katz 
Katz Group of Companies
Edmonton Oilers
Rogers Place
Ice District

References

 
2014 establishments in Alberta
Edmonton Oilers
Katz Group
O
Sports management companies
Canadian companies established in 2014
Companies based in Edmonton